Larra, also known as mole cricket wasps or mole cricket hunters, is a genus of wasps that prey on various species of mole crickets. They have gained prominence as integrated pest management agents.

Distribution 
Members of this genus are found worldwide, particularly in the tropics.

Life cycle
Larra wasps feed on nectar as adults. Female wasps hunt adult or late-instar mole crickets and lay their eggs upon them, first temporarily paralyzing them by stinging them on the underside. The larva, upon hatching, gradually consumes the host, eventually killing it. It then pupates in or near the remains. The adults are solitary and do not form colonies. Incubation and development are highly variable in length and dependent upon temperature; in winter, the larvae may enter diapause. Each Larra species preferentially hunts a particular set of prey species, even when related prey is available.

The temporary paralysis of the host is a distinctive feature of the genus out of its close allies. Other related wasps generally paralyze the host permanently and bury it so that the larva can consume it undisturbed.

Human importance
Larra polita, which is endemic to the Philippines, was successfully introduced to Hawaii in 1925 to help control Gryllotalpa orientalis, the oriental mole cricket.

A related species, L. bicolor, was introduced to Puerto Rico in 1928 to control the accidentally introduced Neoscapteriscus didactylus, the Changa mole cricket. Subsequent efforts were made to introduce L. bicolor to Florida for the same reason, and a population was established by 1993.

Species

There are 64 described species of Larra.

 Larra abdominalis Guérin-Méneville in Lefebvre, 1849
 Larra alecto (F. Smith, 1858)
 Larra altamazonica F. Williams, 1928
 Larra amplipennis (F. Smith, 1873)
 Larra analis Fabricius, 1804
 Larra anathema (Rossi, 1790)
 Larra angustifrons Kohl, 1892
 Larra apicipennis Cameron, 1904
 Larra aponis Tsuneki, 1983
 Larra arabica Schmid-Egger, 2014
 Larra betsilea de Saussure, 1887
 Larra bicolor Fabricius, 1804
 Larra bicolorata Cameron, 1904
 Larra bulawayoensis Bischoff, 1913
 Larra burmeisterii  (Holmberg, 1884)
 Larra carbonaria  (F. Smith, 1858)
 Larra cassandra Schrottky, 1902
 Larra coelestina  (F. Smith, 1873)
 Larra corrugata R. Turner, 1912
 Larra diversa  (Walker, 1871)
 Larra dorsalis Tsuneki, 1982
 Larra dux  (Kohl, 1892)
 Larra erratica Bingham, 1897
 Larra erythropyga R. Turner, 1916
 Larra extrema Dahlbom, 1845
 Larra femorata  (de Saussure, 1854)
 Larra fenchihuensis Tsuneki, 1967
 Larra fuscinerva Cameron, 1900
 Larra glabrata  (F. Smith, 1856)
 Larra godmani Cameron, 1889
 Larra heydenii  (de Saussure, 1890)
 Larra iliensis Kazenas, 1978
 Larra impressifrons Arnold, 1923
 Larra madecassa de Saussure, 1887
 Larra mansueta  (F. Smith, 1865)
 Larra maura  (Fabricius, 1787)
 Larra mediterranea Gistel, 1857
 Larra melania Tsuneki, 1982
 Larra melanocnemis R. Turner, 1916
 Larra melanoptera Kohl, 1884
 Larra mendax  (F. Smith, 1865)
 Larra mundula Kohl, 1894
 Larra neaera Nurse, 1903
 Larra nigripes  (Fabricius, 1793)
 Larra obscurior Dalla Torre, 1894
 Larra outeniqua Arnold, 1923
 Larra polita  (F. Smith, 1858)
Larra polita luzonensis Rohwer, 1919
 Larra praedatrix  (Strand, 1910)
 Larra princeps  (F. Smith, 1851)
 Larra psilocera Kohl, 1884
 Larra pusilla Arnold, 1932
 Larra pygidialis Cameron, 1904
 Larra rufa Arnold, 1929
 Larra saussurei Kohl, 1892
 Larra similis  (Mocsáry, 1892)
 Larra simillima  (F. Smith, 1856)
 Larra sinensis  (Mocsáry, 1892)
 Larra stangei Menke, 1992
 Larra tarsata  (F. Smith, 1860)
 Larra tawitawiensis Tsuneki, 1976
 Larra transcaspica F. Morawitz, 1894
 Larra variipes de Saussure, 1892
 Larra vechti Sudheendrakumar and Narendran, 1985
 Larra zarudniana Gussakovskij, 1933

References

Crabronidae